Anoka Conservation District is a government entity that provides technical assistance and tools to manage and protect land and water resources in Anoka County, Minnesota.

It currently consists of 8 staff and 5 elected supervisors.

The Board are elected at large on staggered 4 year terms with 3 members or 2 members up for election every 2 years. Currently the following people serve on the Board of Supervisors for Anoka Conservation District.

District 1 (Bethel, St. Francis, Nowthen, Oak Grove): Steve Laitinen
District 2 (Ramsey, Anoka, Andover): Jim Lindahl
District 3 (Coon Rapids, Spring Lake Park, Fridley, Columbia Heights): Glenda Meixell
District 4 (Ham Lake, Blaine, Circle Pines, Lino Lakes, Centerville): Mary Jo Truchon
District 5 (East Bethel, Linwood Township, Columbus): Sharon LeMay

References

External links 

 Official website

Local government in Minnesota
Organizations based in Minnesota
Anoka County, Minnesota
Water conservation in the United States